MAR-290 is a 290 mm single-stage ground-to-ground multiple rocket launcher manufactured by Israel Military Industries introduced in 1973. The rocket was based on the Soviet-made 240mm BM-24 MLRS. The rocket's maximum range was 42 kilometers and was based on an M4 Sherman chassis with a new Cummins VT-8-460 diesel engine, and a prototype of a Centurion-based MAR-290  named "Eshel Ha-Yarden" and was also tested on an M548.

MAR-290 Was capable of firing two types of rockets, HE named Eivri, or cluster named Chaviv.

See also 
LAR-160
ACCULAR
T-122 Sakarya
Fajr-5
TOROS
Falaq-2
EXTRA
Predator Hawk
BM-27 Uragan
BM-30 Smerch

References

Rocket artillery
Multiple rocket launchers of Israel